Ivanka Marinova Hristova (19 November 1941 – 24 February 2022) was a Bulgarian shot putter. She won the gold medal at the 1976 Summer Olympics, and the bronze in 1972. In addition she won the 1976 European Indoor Championships. Khristova died on 24 February 2022, at the age of 80.

World records
 21.87 metres on 3 July 1976 in Belmeken
 21.89 metres on 5 July 1976 in Belmeken

Her latest record only stood until 26 September 1976 when Czechoslovak Helena Fibingerová improved it to 21.99 metres.

Major achievements

References

External links 
 
 
 

1941 births
2022 deaths
Bulgarian female shot putters
Sportspeople from Sofia Province
Olympic athletes of Bulgaria
Olympic gold medalists for Bulgaria
Olympic bronze medalists for Bulgaria
Athletes (track and field) at the 1964 Summer Olympics
Athletes (track and field) at the 1968 Summer Olympics
Athletes (track and field) at the 1972 Summer Olympics
Athletes (track and field) at the 1976 Summer Olympics
World record setters in athletics (track and field)
Olympic gold medalists in athletics (track and field)
Olympic bronze medalists in athletics (track and field)
Medalists at the 1976 Summer Olympics
21st-century Bulgarian women
20th-century Bulgarian women